USS L-6 (SS-45) was an L-class submarine built for the United States Navy during the 1910s.

Description
The L-class boats designed by Lake Torpedo Boat (L-5 through L-8) were built to slightly different specifications from the other L boats, which were designed by Electric Boat, and are sometimes considered a separate L-5 class. They displaced  on the surface and  submerged. The L-class submarines had a crew of 28 officers and enlisted men.

For surface running, the boats were powered by two  diesel engines, each driving one propeller shaft. When submerged each propeller was driven by a  electric motor. They could reach  on the surface and  underwater.

The boats were armed with four 18-inch (450 mm)  torpedo tubes in the bow. They carried four reloads, for a total of eight torpedoes. The L-class submarines were also armed with a single 3"/50 caliber deck gun.

Construction and career
L-6s keel was laid down on 27 May 1914 by Craig Shipbuilding Company in Long Beach, California. L-6 was launched on 31 August 1916 sponsored by Mrs. William R. Monroe, and commissioned on 7 December 1917.

Service history
After exercises along the West Coast, L-6 departed Pacific waters on 20 April 1918, arriving Charleston, South Carolina, on 10 June. Following a brief overhaul, the submarine patrolled off Charleston until she sailed on 15 October for the eastern Atlantic. Arriving Ponta Delgada, Azores, in early November, L-6 joined Submarine Division 6 just prior to the signing of the Armistice with Germany on 11 November.

After making stops in Caribbean Sea and Central American ports, L-6 arrived San Pedro, California, on 14 February 1919, completing one of the best long-distance seagoing performances of the United States's youthful submarine force. From 1919 to 1922, she remained on the West Coast, experimenting with new torpedoes and undersea detection equipment. L-6 was placed in commission, in ordinary, on 24 March 1922; returned to full commission on 1 July; and sailed for the East Coast the same month. Upon arrival Hampton Roads, L-6 decommissioned on 25 November 1922, and was sold to M. Samuel and Sons on 21 December 1925 for scrapping.

Notes

References

External links
 

United States L-class submarines
World War I submarines of the United States
Ships built in Los Angeles
1916 ships